Biblionef is a book donation non-profit organisation based in several countries Netherlands, South Africa, France, Dutch Caribbean, Flanders, Suriname and Ghana. Biblionef donates new storybooks to under-privileged children and adolescents. The organisation donates books to institutions like schools, day care centres, crèches and other organisations with an educational focus in informal settlements and rural areas.

Background 
Jonkheer Mr.Maximilien Vegelin van Claerbergen, a former Dutch ambassador, initiated Biblionef in 1989 in France. The name Biblionef derives from "biblio" referring to books and "nef" referring to a ship. The organisation's stated objective is to provide children in disadvantaged areas of the world with new storybooks.

Biblionef SA 

Biblionef SA is part of an international network of 6 independent non-profit organisations. Due to South Africa's education and literacy problems, a Biblionef depot was opened in the SASNEV Building (4 Central Square, Pinelands, Cape Town) in August 1998. Executive Director, Jean Williams, established Biblionef SA under the auspices of Biblionef's founder, Vegelin van Claerbergen.

The office houses a book stock covering stories in all eleven official languages of South Africa. Biblionef SA operates as an independent, non-profit organization. It is responsible for obtaining and distributing the new storybooks to underprivileged children in South Africa. The cost of the books, shipping, warehousing, and administration is covered by funds from foundations, corporations and individuals.

Biblionef Netherlands 
The Dutch Biblionef coordinates also Biblionef Ghana, Biblionef Dutch Caribbean and is supportive to Biblionef Suriname and Biblionef South Africa which it also founded. It operates from The Hague. Among the board members are Rein van Charldorp (Chair and managing director of OCLC) and Bjorn Stenvers.

Biblionef France 
Is the first Biblionef and was founded in 1989. It operates from Paris and supports all French-speaking countries.

Biblionef Belgium 
They have an office in Flanders.

Biblionef differs from many other book donation organisations in 2 key areas:
 Biblionef donates new children storybooks in all the official languages (e.g. the 7 of South Africa).
 Due to the shortage of mother-tongue publications, the organisation works with local publishers and writers to commission the printing of children's books in the African languages.

Results 
 Donated 1,241,059 new story books
 Benefited 7,252 children's organizations
 Reached 3,477,000 children
 Donated an average of 12,000 books per month
 Assisted 51 schools and communities with informal libraries
 Commissioned the translations and publication or reprints of 83 titles in one or more of South Africa's official languages
 Supported 21 schools for the visually impaired with braille and large print books

Awards and recognition 
 Western Cape Government's Promotion of Marginalised Indigenous Languages Awards – February 2014

References

External links 
 

Libraries in Cape Town
1998 establishments in South Africa
Non-profit organisations based in South Africa
Organizations promoting literacy